Santander Ospina born January 28, 1974, is a retired Colombian football defender.

External links
 Santander Ospina at BDFA.com.ar 

1974 births
Living people
Colombian footballers
Atlético Nacional footballers
Boyacá Chicó F.C. footballers
Millonarios F.C. players
Association football defenders